The Usarp Mountains are a major Antarctic mountain range, lying west of the Rennick Glacier and trending north to south for about . The feature is bounded to the north by Pryor Glacier and the Wilson Hills.

These mountains were discovered and first photographed from aircraft of the U.S. Navy Operation Highjump in 1946. They were first sighted and entered by the U.S. Victoria Land Traverse 1959-1960 (VLT), and the first ascent of Mount Welcome was made by John G. Weihaupt, Alfred Stuart, Claude Lorius, and Arnold Heine of that traverse team. The mountains were completely mapped by the United States Geological Survey from VLT reports, U.S. Navy air photos from 1960–63, and subsequent surveys. The name is an acronym of the United States Antarctic Research Program (USARP), and was applied by Advisory Committee on Antarctic Names (US-ACAN) in recognition of the accomplishments of that program in Antarctica.
  A detailed account of the Victoria Land Traverse appears in the Geological Society of Americas SPECIAL PAPER 488, dated 2012.



List of mountains 
 Emlen Peaks A group of scattered peaks and nunataks, 16 mi long and 7 mi wide, lying 6 mi south of Daniels Range in the south end of the Usarp Mountains. Mapped by USGS from surveys and U.S. Navy air photos, 1960-63. Named by US-ACAN after John T. Emlen, biologist, University of Wisconsin, program leader who made penguin navigational studies on the Ross Ice Shelf, the interior of Victoria Land, and elsewhere in Antarctica, 1962-63.
 Helliwell Hills A group of rocky hills and low mountains about 18 mi long and 9 mi wide. The hills lie south of Gressitt Glacier and midway between Emlen Peaks and the Morozumi Range. Mapped by USGS from surveys and U.S. Navy air photos, 1960-63. Named by US-ACAN for Robert A. Helliwell of Stanford University, Program Director for the USARP study of very low frequency (VLF) radio noise phenomena.
 Mount Shields –  A mountain at the junction of the Pryor and Robilliard Glaciers, at the north end of the Usarp Mountains. Named by US-ACAN for Staff Sergeant James K. Shields, United States Marine Corps (USMC), assigned to U.S. Navy Squadron VX-6 in Antarctica, 1962–63 and 1963-64. During 1962, Shields served as navigator on aircraft in support of the USGS Topo West survey of this area.
 Ship Nunatak A very striking nunatak which rises above the ice near the center of the upper portion of Harlin Glacier. Mapped by USGS from surveys and U.S. Navy air photos, 1960-63. A descriptive name applied by US-ACAN because of the appearance of the feature, resembling that of a ship at sea.
 Mount Simmonds –  A mountain standing higher and next westward of Mount Theaker along the north side of Robilliard Glacier. Surveyed in 1962-63 by USGS and in 1963-64 by New Zealand Geological Survey Antarctic Expedition (NZGSAE). Named by New Zealand Antarctic Place-Names Committee (NZ-APC) for G.A.E. Simmonds, New Zealand cartographer engaged in preparing final drawings of Antarctic maps, 1961-67.
 Mount Theaker –  A mountain along the north wall of Robilliard Glacier, 3 mi NE of Mount Simmonds. Mapped by USGS from surveys and U.S. Navy aerial photographs, 1960-62. Named by US-ACAN for Paul R. Theaker, USARP biologist at McMurdo Station, 1967-68.
Additional mountains include Welcome Mountain, Mount Van der Hoeven, Mount Weihaupt, Mount Stuart, Mount Lorius, Smith Bench, Mount Roberts, Daniels Range, and Morozumi Range.

List of geological features 
 Armstrong Platform A mainly ice-covered height, or small plateau, which is a northeastward extension of Pomerantz Tableland. The feature is 5 mi long and ranges from 1,200 to 1,800 m in elevation and rises directly north of Helfferich Glacier. Mapped by USGS from surveys and U.S. Navy aerial photographs, 1960-62. Named by US-ACAN for Richard L. Armstrong, USARP geologist at McMurdo Station, 1967-68.
 Helfferich Glacier A glacier about 8 mi long which drains the east slopes of Pomerantz Tableland southward of Armstrong Platform. Mapped by USGS from surveys and U.S. Navy air photos, 1960-62. Named by US-ACAN for Merritt R. Helfferich, USARP worker in the field of ionospheric physics at South Pole Station, 1967-68.
 Pomerantz Tableland A high (2,290 m) ice-covered tableland about 10 mi long, standing 15 mi NW of Daniels Range. Mapped by USGS from surveys and U.S. Navy air photos, 1960-62. Named by US-ACAN for Martin A. Pomerantz, Director of the Barthol Research Foundation and Chairman of the U.S. Committee for the International Year of the Quiet Sun, who carried on cosmic ray studies in the McMurdo Sound area, 1959–60 and 1960-61.MacPherson Peak is on the northwest end of Pomerantz Tableland.
 Robilliard Glacier A valley glacier, 17 mi long, which flows northeastward through the mountain range. It rises southward of Mount Simmonds and emerges from the mountains at Mount Shields, where it joins Kooperatsiya Ice Piedmont. Mapped by USGS from surveys and U.S. Navy air photos, 1960-62. Named by US-ACAN for Gordon Robilliard, USARP biologist at McMurdo Station in 1967-68 and 1968-69.

See also
 Fisher Spur
 Guenter Bluff
 List of Ultras of Antarctica
 List of glaciers in the Antarctic
 Glaciology

References

Mountain ranges of Victoria Land
Oates Land
Pennell Coast